Brijest is a village in Osijek-Baranja County, Croatia. It is part of the City of Osijek.

Populated places in Osijek-Baranja County

Osijek